Crunden is a surname. Notable people with the surname include:

Frederick M. Crunden (1847–1911), American librarian
John Crunden ( 1741–1835), British architectural and furniture designer
Robert M. Crunden (1940–1999), American historian

See also
Cruden